Mahoning County is a county in the U.S. state of Ohio. As of the 2020 census, the population was 228,614. Its county seat and largest city is Youngstown. The county is named after the Mahoning River and was formed on March 1, 1846; the 83rd county in Ohio. Until 1846, the area that is now Mahoning County was part of Trumbull and Columbiana counties, when the counties in the area were redefined and Mahoning County emerged as a new county. Mahoning County is part of the Youngstown-Warren-Boardman, OH-PA Metropolitan Statistical Area.

History
In the year 1600, Mahoning County was likely divided between two nations of Native Americans, the Erie people in the east and the Whittlesey culture in the west. It is unknown where the actual boundaries between these cultures lied, though the nearest confirmed Whittlesey settlement was at Cleveland and the nearest confirmed Erie settlement was just barely across the Ohio-Pennsylvania border, in Ashtabula County. The Erie were an Iroquoian people who likely arrived sometime between the years 1100-1300 AD, after chasing out an older nation of "Mound Builders." The Whittlesey were likely Algonquian, but lived in longhouses rather than the traditional Algonquian wigwams.

Following the Beaver Wars, when the Iroquois Confederacy declared war on many of the tribes of the Great Lakes region over several decades and destroyed them, new tribes moved into this area. The tribes who shared the resources of the Mahoning Valley included the Seneca, Lenape (Delaware), Shawnee, and Wyandot. The Seneca and Wyandot were Iroquoians, and the Lenape and Shawnee were Algonquians. As northeast Ohio later came to be under control of the settlers as part of the Connecticut Western Reserve, all tribes were pushed further westward or southward, before eventually being removed from Ohio by the United States in the early-mid 1800s.

Some former known Native American sites that existed in Mahoning County include the council rock and the North Benton burial mound. Council Rock was where the Shawnee and Lenape were known to gather for collective holiday celebrations, religion ceremonies and political meetings and once sat in the center of Youngstown. Though the rock was moved long ago, it still rests in what is now Lincoln Park. The North Benton burial mound was once located on the outskirts of North Benton and was removed by archeologists. It was attributed to the Hopewell culture, but contained unique features, such as sculptures of constellations made of white rocks and clay laid out at ground level and a pit full of mixed human bones in one corner. It shared features with two other burial mounds found and excavated in Kent, Ohio and Warren, Pennsylvania represents a completely unique style of burial mound in Ohio.

Prior to its formation of a county in 1846, Mahoning County was a destination for a family of Huguenot refugees in the early 1800s.

In the 1900s, Youngstown was a hub for the American steel industry and for local mob groups, who gained their power through the liquor and gambling industries during prohibition, remaining a key safety issue for the region until the 1970s. It was also the home to Warner Theatre, where the Warner Bros. film studio got its start and remained a hub for early film and television for decades. An extensive German community used to exist in the township of Berlin, until pressure to fully assimilate after the World Wars against Germany ended it. Brier Hill Pizza was invented in Youngstown’s Brier Hill neighborhood and is considered a local delicacy.

Geography

Adjacent counties
 Trumbull County (north)
 Mercer County, Pennsylvania (northeast)
 Lawrence County, Pennsylvania (east)
 Columbiana County (south)
 Stark County (southwest)
 Portage County (northwest)

Major Highways

Demographics

2000 census
As of the census of 2000, there were 257,555 people, 102,587 households, and 68,835 families living in the county. The population density was 620 people per square mile (239/km2). There were 111,762 housing units at an average density of 269 per square mile (104/km2). The racial makeup of the county was 81.04% White, 15.87% Black or African American, 0.17% Native American, 0.47% Asian, 0.02% Pacific Islander, 1.03% from other races, and 1.38% from two or more races. 2.97% of the population were Hispanic or Latino of any race.

93.1% spoke English, 2.6% Spanish, 1.0% Italian, and 0.5% Greek as their first language.

There were 102,587 households, out of which 28.40% had children under the age of 18 living with them, 49.00% were married couples living together, 14.10% had a female householder with no husband present, and 32.90% were non-families. 29.10% of all households were made up of individuals, and 13.10% had someone living alone who was 65 years of age or older. The average household size was 2.44 and the average family size was 3.02.

In the county, the population was spread out, with 23.70% under the age of 18, 8.40% from 18 to 24, 26.40% from 25 to 44, 23.70% from 45 to 64, and 17.80% who were 65 years of age or older. The median age was 40 years. For every 100 females there were 91.40 males. For every 100 females age 18 and over, there were 88.00 males.

The median income for a household in the county was $35,248, and the median income for a family was $44,185. Males had a median income of $36,313 versus $23,272 for females. The per capita income for the county was $18,818. About 9.60% of families and 12.50% of the population were below the poverty line, including 19.10% of those under age 18 and 8.70% of those age 65 or over.

2010 census
As of the 2010 census, there were 238,823 people, 98,712 households, and 62,676 families living in the county. The racial makeup of the county was 79.9% white, 15.7% black or African American, 0.7% Asian, 0.2% American Indian, 1.4% from other races, and 2.1% from two or more races. Those of Hispanic or Latino origin made up 4.7% of the population. In terms of ancestry, 21.4% were German, 18.4% were Italian, 16.6% were Irish, 8.9% were English, and 4.2% were American.

Of the 98,712 households, 27.9% had children under the age of 18 living with them, 43.7% were married couples living together, 15.0% had a female householder with no husband present, 36.5% were non-families, and 31.8% of all households were made up of individuals. The average household size was 2.34 and the average family size was 2.94. The median age was 42.9 years.

The median income for a household in the county was $40,123 and the median income for a family was $52,489. Males had a median income of $44,516 versus $31,969 for females. The per capita income for the county was $22,824. About 12.6% of families and 16.6% of the population were below the poverty line, including 25.9% of those under age 18 and 10.0% of those age 65 or over.

Economy

Top Employers
According to the county's 2019 Comprehensive Annual Financial Report, the top employers in the county are:

Politics
 
Mahoning County is historically Democratic-leaning, voting for the Democratic presidential candidate in every election from 1976 through 2016. Between 1976 and 2012 Mahoning County voted Democratic by at least a margin of 17 percentage points for every election. In 2016, Hillary Clinton won the county over Donald Trump by 3.3 percent, the smallest margin since 1972; in 2012, Barack Obama carried the county over Mitt Romney by a solid 28.3 percent. However, in 2020, Donald Trump flipped the county Republican for the first time since Richard Nixon's national landslide victory in 1972, carrying it by a margin of 1.9 percentage points.

At the statewide level, Mahoning County generally votes Democratic as well. Since 1970, the county has only voted Republican three times at the gubernatorial level – in the landslide elections of 1994, 2014, and 2022.

Between 2012 and 2022, Mahoning County was split between Ohio's 13th Congressional District and Ohio's 6th Congressional District. After the 2020 redistricting cycle, the county was moved entirely into the 6th district, which is currently represented by Congressman Bill Johnson. 

|}

Government

Mahoning County officials

Mahoning County judgeships

Ohio House of Representatives

Ohio State Senate

United States House of Representatives

United States Senate

Education

Colleges and universities
 Avalon University School of Medicine
 Youngstown State University

Community, junior, and technical colleges
 Choffin Career and Technical Center
 Eastern Gateway Community College
 Mahoning County Career and Technical Center

Public school districts
School districts include:

 Alliance City School District
 Austintown Local School District
 Boardman Local School District
 Campbell City School District
 Canfield Local School District
 Columbiana Exempted Village School District
 Girard City School District
 Hubbard Exempted Village School District
 Jackson-Milton Local School District
 Leetonia Exempted Village School District
 Lowellville Local School District
 Poland Local School District
 Sebring Local School District
 South Range Local School District
 Springfield Local School District
 Struthers City School District
 Weathersfield Local School District
 West Branch Local School District
 Western Reserve Local School District
 Youngstown City School District

High schools

 Austintown Fitch High School
 Boardman High School
 Campbell Memorial High School
 Canfield High School
 Cardinal Mooney High School
 Chaney High School
 East High School
 Jackson-Milton High School
 Lowellville High School
 Mahoning County High School
 McKinley High School
 Poland Seminary High School
 South Range High School
 Springfield High School
 Struthers High School
 Ursuline High School
 Valley Christian School
 Valley STEM + ME2 Academy
 West Branch High School
 Western Reserve High School

Communities

Cities

 Alliance (part)
 Campbell
 Canfield
 Columbiana (part)
 Salem (part)
 Struthers
 Youngstown (part) (county seat)

Villages

 Beloit
 Craig Beach
 Lowellville
 New Middletown
 Poland
 Sebring
 Washingtonville (part)

Townships

 Austintown
 Beaver
 Berlin
 Boardman
 Canfield
 Coitsville
 Ellsworth
 Goshen
 Green
 Jackson
 Milton
 Poland
 Smith
 Springfield

Census-designated places

 Austintown
 Damascus (part)
 East Alliance
 Lake Milton
 Maple Ridge
 Mineral Ridge (part)
 New Springfield
 North Lima
 Petersburg
 Woodworth

Unincorporated communities

 Berlin Center
 Blanco
 Calla
 Coitsville Center
 East Lewistown
 Ellsworth
 Fredericksburg
 Garfield
 Greenford
 Hickory Corners
 Knaufville
 Locust Grove
 New Albany
 New Buffalo
 Newport Village Historic District
 North Benton
 North Jackson
 Ohltown
 Paradise
 Patmos
 Poland Center
 Rosemont
 Snodes
 West Austintown

Population ranking
The population ranking of the following table is based on the 2020 census of Mahoning County.

* minority of municipality located in Mahoning County
† county seat

See also
 National Register of Historic Places listings in Mahoning County, Ohio

References

External links

 County website

 
Appalachian Ohio
Counties of Appalachia
1846 establishments in Ohio